Arjun Charan Hembram is an Indian writer of Santali language and banker from Odisha. He won Sahitya Akademi Award in 2012.

Biography
Hembram was born on 1952 in Ghatkuanri, Mayurbhanj, Orissa. He is the founder-editor of Santali literary magazine Chai Champa. He also brought out Santali fortnightly magazine Bahabonga.

Hembram was awarded Sahitya Akademi Award in 2013 for his poetry Chanda Bonga. Two of his books, Lade Sarjom and Chanda Bonga, are included in the curriculum of North Orissa University and Union Public Service Commission.

References

Living people
1952 births
People from Mayurbhanj district
Recipients of the Sahitya Akademi Award in Santali
Santali people